The Symphony Orchestra of Sri Lanka (SOSL) is based in Colombo, Sri Lanka, and is one of the oldest orchestras in South Asia.

Its first concert was on 13 September 1956 under the baton of Hussain S. Mohamed, and the repertoire was Geminiani's Second Concerto Grosso, Haydn's Symphony no. 92 "Oxford" and Beethoven's Fourth Piano Concerto with Malinee Jayasinghe-Peris as soloist. Kalakeerthi Prof. Earle de Fonseka was the next principal conductor, a position he held from 1960 to 2000. Lalanath de Silva, who was for many years deputy conductor, took over the position of principal conductor from 2000 to 2002.

From 2002 Ajit Abeysekera (2002–2015), Ananda Dabare (2002-2012), Manilal Weerakoon (2002-2011) and Eshantha J. Peiris (2008-2015) have jointly held the position of principal conductor.

The present Principal Conductor is Dushyanthi Perera.

Soloists who have performed with the orchestra include Gervase de Peyer (clarinet), Barry Tuckwell (horn), Richard Adeney (flute), Thomas Brandis and Leon Spierer (violin, then concertmasters of the Berlin Philharmonic Orchestra), Paul Olefsky and Rohan de Saram (cello), Rodney Slatford (double bass), Druvi de Saram, Peter Cooper, Ian Lake, Robin Zebaida, Anthony Peebles, Ashan Pillai and Rohan de Silva (piano). In addition to subscription concerts (the number varies annually), there are other performances on special occasions. It regularly performs at the Ladies College Hall. Sri Lankan, as well as soloists and conductors of other nationalities, including James Ross and Gregory Rose, have performed regularly with the orchestra on invitation. In 2013, SOSL gave its first performance at Colombo's new Nelum Pokuna Theatre conducted by James Ross, joined by 35 musicians from the UK and India to form The Commonwealth Festival Orchestra.

Administration

The Governors and the Players' Committees are elected by the players at the Annual General Meeting. The Board of Governors establishes overall policy, raises sponsorship and controls the finances. The Panel of Regents serves in a senior advisory capacity. The Players' Committee makes decisions concerning the music, soloists and the conductors.

Sri Lankan Talent

The SOSL takes special interest in fostering young Sri Lankan talent, and dedicates one of its annual subscription concerts to feature Young Soloists. The Family Christmas Concert of SOSL is one such annual event to showcase such young talent.

Its Christmas concert of December 2013 held at Bandaranaike Memorial International Conference Hall (BMICH) in Colombo saw the orchestra conducted by Eshantha Pieris and featured vocalists Charin Mendis and Sheranga Perera. In December 2018, the Family Christmas Concert was held at the Ladies College Hall, conducted by Dushyanthi Perera and featured performances by soloists Dmitri Gunatilake and Niran De Mel and performances by the Old Joes’ Choir and the Menaka Singers.

SOSL Outreach

The SOSL Outreach Programme takes the form of a series of lecture concerts. Children who have never seen a symphony orchestra before are introduced to the instruments that make up the sections of an orchestra. The range, tone, and method of sound production of each instrument is demonstrated. Students, Teachers and Parents are invited, free of charge, to attend these concerts. The first of these concerts took place in Galle, Sri Lanka on 24 April 2010. The Second was in Kilinochchi in the north of Sri Lanka, in November 2011. The Third was at the Veerasingham Hall, Jaffna, on 17 November 2012.

Finances

The SOSL is a not for profit organisation which depends on public support as well as corporate sector and occasionally diplomatic sponsorship for its activities.

References

External links 
Official Website

Sri Lankan orchestras
Musical groups established in 1958
1958 establishments in Ceylon